Jaunpils is a village in Tukums Municipality in the Semigallia region of Latvia.

External links

Towns and villages in Latvia
Castles of the Teutonic Knights
Tukums Municipality
Semigallia